The Watal are a community found in Jammu and Kashmir, India. The term 'Watal' also means cobbler in Kashmiri language. The community is known by many names such as Batal, Battal, and Batul, and have been granted Scheduled Caste status.

The Watal are a Kashmiri-speaking community, confined entirely to the Kashmir Valley. They are broadly divided into three sub-groups, the Seraj who are cobblers by profession, the Schupriya Watal who are manufacturers of the schup or winnowing fans and the Khumb Watal, who occupy the lowest status as they work as scavengers as well as tanners, occupations that are traditionally seen as polluting by other Kashmiri Muslim tribes.

The Shupir Watals, who claim to have been also known as Harmādānī Sheikh, are of uncertain origin. They are found mainly in the areas of Srinagar, Tangmarg, Baramulla and Sopore. They speak an Indo-Aryan language known as Sheikha gal or Watali.

Present circumstances 

According to 2001 Census of India, the Watal numbered 169, although there total numbers are probably underreported, as the name Watal carries a stigma. This is seen by the fact that their entrance to temples and shrines was restricted, although this is no longer practiced, there are still occasionally prevented from entering places of worship. They are strictly endogamous, and prefer marrying close relatives. In general, their customs are similar to other Kashmiri Muslims, and the Watal are Sunni.

The Watal are a landless community, and most rural Watal are still employed as scavengers and sweepers, with agriculture labour being an important subsidiary occupation. In the cities, many are employed by the municipalities as cleaners, while many are also specifically employed to clear snow from roads in the winter. The Watal are an extremely marginalized group, with the majority of the community being illiterate.

Watals in Hindu Community 

Watal (or Wattal) is a surname in the Kashmiri Brahmin community as well. It is not clear whether this surname is associated with the profession of scavenging or not. Some people claim that the ancestor of these people was a saint called Wattalnath. However, there is no documented proof for that. 
Jawahar Wattal a music composer of our times, is one of the prominent Kashmiri Hindu Watals.

See also 

List of Scheduled Castes in Jammu and Kashmir

References 

Social groups of India
Social groups of Jammu and Kashmir
Kashmiri tribes
Dalit communities
Scheduled Castes of Jammu and Kashmir